Burlington High School is located at 123 Cambridge Street in Burlington, Massachusetts. Burlington High School is a four-year comprehensive high school that is credited by the New England Association of Schools and Colleges.

Burlington High was one of 30 schools in the state of Massachusetts named to the AP Honor Roll by the College Board in 2011 for simultaneously increasing access to Advanced Placement coursework while maintaining or increasing the percentage of students earning scores of 3 or higher on AP exams.

Burlington High School is ranked #39 in the recently released 2015 Boston Magazine rankings. This is up from their ranking of #67 in 2014. According to Boston Magazine, these rankings are based heavily on MCAS scores and schools are not contacted annually for updated data.

Campus 
The campus currently housing Burlington High School was opened in 1973 and is situated on 365,000 sq ft of land. Along with the grades 9-12 senior high school, the facilities on site are home to the school district's central administration offices, Burlington Cable Access TV, the Burlington Science Center, and the Burlington Early Childhood Center.  As a result of facilitating the Early Childhood Center, Burlington High School includes Pre-Kindergarten and Kindergarten demographic statistics to the Massachusetts Department of Education in their yearly reports, and these students are considered part of the High School's enrollment.

Student Demographics

Performing arts
Burlington High School's Performing Arts are a culmination of efforts from the Burlington Public Schools' Music Department, various performance clubs, and the high school English Department.

John E. Fogelberg Performing Arts Center is the primary performance space at Burlington High School. The auditorium is designed as a proscenium theatre.  The stage is a wood floor.

Music

In May, 2014 The Burlington High School Select Singers sang at the famous NYC Carnegie Hall as part of a festival with three other choruses from around the United States. Additionally, the Burlington High School Chorus won Gold at the 2010 Great East Music Festival, and the Select Singers won Platinum at the same event.  The Music Department also fields the Red Devil Marching Band and a Concert Band, as well as an extra-curricular Jazz Band.  The singing groups and Concert and Jazz Bands have numerous concerts throughout the school year in the Fogelberg Performing Arts Center.  The Red Devil Marching Band has performed in Disney World through the Disney Performing Arts Program many times, most recently in April 2013. The marching band also performs at all home and away Varsity football games in the Fall during halftime.

Drama

During the school year, two major theater productions are performed.

In December, a small-cast play is performed in the Fogelberg Performing Arts Center.  Cast members are not required to be members of Drama Club.  The tradition of a Fall play began in the 2006–2007 school year.  The first Fall play was Fools, followed by The Importance of Being Earnest, Rumors, The Crucible,  It's A Wonderful Life, Noises Off, A Midsummer Night's Dream, Arsenic and Old Lace, Almost, Maine, The Miracle Worker, Twelfth Night, and most recently, Fahrenheit 451.  The Stage Crew Club organizes a prep crew and running crew for the production as well as providing a student Stage Manager and student technicians.

A full-scale musical is performed in March and April for two weekends.  There is a large cast and crew, and professional set, lighting and costume designers are hired.  The Stage Crew Club and parent volunteers construct the sets using the Fogelberg Performing Arts Center's shop space, and the club fields a crew of trained students to provide all technical support.  Recent musicals include Jekyll & Hyde in 2005, Anything Goes in 2006, Les Misérables in 2007, Thoroughly Modern Millie (the first to run for more than one weekend) in 2008, The Wizard of Oz in 2009, Titanic in 2010, Disney's Beauty and the Beast in 2011, Kiss Me, Kate in 2012, Hairspray in 2013, Grease in 2014, The Music Man in 2015, Mary Poppins in 2016, and Peter Pan in 2017. Pippin will be performed in 2018.

Sports
Burlington is a member of the Middlesex League.  Among the school's most notable recent successes are the eight consecutive state championships for the cheerleading team (2004-2011), the two consecutive Division I hockey championships (2012-2013), the boys' gymnastics state championship in 2012, and the two state finals appearances in three years for the softball team (2011 & 2013). The boys' soccer team won the 2015 middlesex league title as well, setting a new school record for best regular season record (14-1-3).

Available sports (by season) at Burlington High School:

Fall:

Winter:

Spring:

Notable alumni
Peter Carruthers & Kitty Carruthers, Silver Medalists, 1984 Winter Olympics, Pairs Figure Skating
Bob Ganley, city manager
David Lovering drummer The Pixies
Roderick MacKinnon, nobel prize winner
Jay Pandolfo, ice hockey player; forward, Boston Bruins
Amy Poehler
Greg Poehler
 Steve Strachan, NFL Running Back
Steven Wright

References

External links

Burlington, Massachusetts
Public high schools in Massachusetts
Schools in Middlesex County, Massachusetts